Calvert is an unincorporated community in Norton County, Kansas, United States.

History
A post office was opened in Calvert in 1885, and remained in operation until it was discontinued in 1953.

References

Further reading

External links
 Norton County maps: Current, Historic, KDOT

Unincorporated communities in Norton County, Kansas
Unincorporated communities in Kansas